Dark is a German science fiction thriller television series co-created by Baran bo Odar and Jantje Friese. It ran for three seasons from 2017 to 2020. The story follows characters from the fictional town of Winden, Germany, as they pursue the truth in the aftermath of a child's disappearance. They follow connections between four estranged families to unravel a sinister time travel conspiracy which spans several generations. The series explores the existential implications of time and its effect on human nature. It features an ensemble cast.

Dark debuted on 1 December 2017 on Netflix; it is the service's first German-language original series. The second season was released on 21 June 2019, while the third and final season was released on 27 June 2020.

Dark received critical acclaim, with praise for its tone, visuals, acting, casting, musical score, and the ambition and complexity of its narrative. The series' ending also received critical praise, with many calling it a "satisfying" conclusion. In 2021, the BBC ranked the series as the 58th greatest TV series of the 21st century.

Overview
Children start vanishing from the German town of Winden, bringing to light the fractured relationships, double lives, and the dark pasts of four families living there, and unfurling a mystery that spans four generations.

The first season begins in 2019, but later grows to include 1986 and 1953 via time travel, when members of the show's central families become aware of a wormhole in the cave system beneath the local nuclear power plant. During the first season, secrets are revealed concerning the Kahnwald, Nielsen, Doppler, and Tiedemann families, and their lives begin crumbling as their ties are exposed. The conspiracy involves the missing children and the history of the town and its citizens.

The second season continues the intertwining families' attempts to reunite with their missing loved ones, several months after the first-season finale, in 2020, 1987 and 1954, respectively. Additional story-lines are set in 2053 and 1921. The second season introduces Sic Mundus Creatus Est, a major faction in the ongoing battle for the ultimate fate of the people of Winden and the world. The season counts down towards the apocalypse.

The third season follows the four families across time in the wake of the apocalypse in 2020. It introduces a parallel world tethered to the first. The third season continues the 1954, 1987, 2020 and 2053 storylines in the first world, while also adding a new 1888 storyline and 2019 and 2052 in the second world, as the factions further their own desires for each world. The season also showcases the main events between all of these years, continuing the events of the season while also serving as backstory for the events of the first two seasons.

Cast and characters
The first season takes place primarily in 2019 but expands to include stories set in 1986, 1953, and – in the final scene of the first season – 2052, with several characters portrayed at various ages by multiple actors.

The second season takes place several months after the first, depicting the initial stories in 2020, 1987, and 1954, respectively, while continuing the future-set storyline into 2053, and adding a fifth storyline, set in 1921.

The third season introduces a storyline based in 1888 and a parallel reality featuring alternate versions of many main characters.

Main characters

Recurring cast
Jennipher Antoni as Ulla Obendorf, Erik Obendorf's mother in 2019 (season 1)
 Nils Brunkhorst as the high school's science teacher in 2019 (seasons 1, 3)
 Lena Dörrie as Clara Schrage, a nurse attending to Helge Doppler in 2019 (season 1)
 Tara Fischer as a friend of Katharina in 1986–1987 (seasons 1–3)
 Leopold Hornung as Torben Wöller, a junior police officer in 2019–2020, Benni/Bernadette's brother (seasons 1–3)
 Tom Jahn as Jürgen Obendorf, Erik Obendorf's father in 2019–2020 (seasons 1–3)
 Anna König as Edda Heimann, a pathologist in 2019 (seasons 1, 3)
 Vico Mücke as Yasin Friese, Elisabeth Doppler's friend in 2019 (season 1)
 Henning Peker as Udo Meier, a pathologist in 1953–1954 (seasons 1–2)
 Barbara Philipp as Selma Ahrens, a caseworker in 1986 (season 1)
 Paul Radom as Erik Obendorf, a teenage drug dealer gone missing in 2019 (season 1)
 Anton Rubtsov as Benni/Bernadette, a transgender prostitute in 2019–2020, Torben's sister (seasons 1–3)
 Sammy Scheuritzel as Kilian Obendorf, Erik Obendorf's brother and Martha and Bartosz's classmate in 2019's alternative world (seasons 1, 3)
 Anna Schönberg as Donata Kraus, a nurse and Ines Kahnwald's co-worker in 1986 (season 1)
 Andreas Schröders as a power plant worker in 2020 (season 2)
 Mieke Schymura as Justyna Jankowski, a junior police officer in 2019–2020 (seasons 1–3)
 Axel Werner as Gustav Tannhaus, H.G. Tannhaus' grandfather and an industrialist fascinated with time travel (season 3)
 Lea Willkowsky as Jasmin Trewen, Claudia Tiedemann's secretary in 1986–1987 (seasons 1–3)
 Roland Wolf as a police officer and co-worker of Egon Tiedemann in 1953–1954 (seasons 1–2)

Family trees

Episodes

Season 1 (2017)

Season 2 (2019)

Season 3 (2020)

Production
Netflix approved the series in February 2016 for a first season consisting of ten one-hour episodes. Principal photography started on 18 October 2016 in and around Berlin (including Saarmund and Tremsdorf in Brandenburg), and ended in March 2017. 

The high school location was filmed at the Reinfelder Schule in Berlin's Charlottenburg-Wilmersdorf neighbourhood. The bridge and the train tracks were filmed on the abandoned  in the middle of the Düppeler forest near Lake Wannsee. The gates to the power plant are those at the Olympic Stadium Bell Tower; the nuclear reactor towers were computer-animated. The recurring street scene of the bus stop and T-intersection was filmed at Fahrtechnik Akademie in Zossen. The truck stop with Benni's caravan is located at Zollamt Berlin-Dreilinden (the former Checkpoint Bravo). Exterior hospital shots were filmed at the old section of Lungenklinik Heckeshorn in Wannsee. Library scenes were filmed at the University of Applied Sciences for Finance in Königs Wusterhausen and Berlin State Library. 

The series was filmed in 4K (Ultra HD) resolution. It is the first German-language Netflix original series and follows a trend of internationally produced Netflix originals, including the Mexican series Club de Cuervos in 2015, the Brazilian series 3% in 2016, the Italian series Suburra: Blood on Rome in 2017, and the Indian series Sacred Games in 2018.

Principal photography for the second season took place on location in Berlin from June 2018.

Filming for the third season began in May 2019 and wrapped in December 2019.

Music

Season 1

Track listing

Season 2

Track listing

Season 3

Track listing

Apart from the score, numerous pre-released songs were also used throughout the series. The song "Goodbye" by Apparat in collaboration with Soap&Skin was used as the opening theme for the episodes. Songs by the vocal ensemble Roomful of Teeth were also heavily featured on multiple episodes; the third movement of Caroline Shaw's Partita for 8 Voices was featured prominently in season one, and Alev Lenz's "May the Angels", also featuring Roomful of Teeth, was used in the season two episode five, "Lost and Found".

Release
The first season of the series was released on 1 December 2017.

A second season was announced with a short teaser on the German Facebook pages of the series and Netflix on 20 December 2017. On 26 April 2019, a second season was announced which was released on 21 June 2019.

On 26 May 2020, a third and final season was announced, which was released on 27 June 2020.

Reception

Critical response

Dark received critical acclaim and has been listed by many publications as one of the best TV shows of the years 2017, 2019, and 2020, as well as of the 2010s, 21st century, and of all time. Vulture included the series in its article A Guide to TV Shows in the 2010s as one of the most notable shows of the decade. BBC ranked it the 58th best TV series of the 21st century. Meanwhile, BuzzFeed named it the 22nd best TV show of all time.

Season 1 
The first season of Dark received mostly positive reviews from critics, with many noting its similarities to the TV series Twin Peaks and another Netflix series Stranger Things. The review aggregator website Rotten Tomatoes gave the first season an approval rating of 89%, with an average rating of 7.4 out of 10, based on 46 critics. The website's critical consensus is "Darks central mystery unfolds slowly, both tense and terrifying, culminating in a creepy, cinematic triumph of sci-fi noir." Metacritic, which assigns a weighted average score out of 100 to reviews and ratings from mainstream publications, gave it a score of 61, based on ten reviews, indicating "generally favorable reviews."

Writing for The Guardian, Lanre Bakare gave Dark a rating of four out of five stars and praised the series for its tone, the complexity of its narrative, and its pacing. Grading the series with a "B", Steve Greene of IndieWire wrote, "Even when Dark is clinical in its set-up of these interweaving story threads, there's still an incredible amount of energy coursing through the show." From Vox, Emily St. James gave it a score of three and a half out of five and said, "Dark is fun to try to solve — it's a treat to tease out the many connections running among the three eras. It's just that at a certain point, it becomes difficult to care about what's happening, beyond simply wanting to figure out how everything is connected." Ariana Romero of Refinery29 noted that the series was darker and more in-depth than Stranger Things. However, there was some criticism by Reason's Glenn Garvin for a heavy-handed approach to its message, a lack of sympathetic characters, and unoriginality of certain aspects of the series.

Los Angeles Times listed Dark as one of the best TV series of 2017, while Thrillist named it the 18th best TV show of the year.

Season 2 
The second season received critical acclaim. Metacritic reported a score of 82 out of 100, based on four reviews, indicating "universal acclaim." At Rotten Tomatoes, season two of the series holds an approval rating of 100% based on 29 reviews, with an average rating of 8.1 out of 10, with the "Certified Fresh" status. The website's critical consensus states, "Darks sumptuous second season descends deeper into the show's meticulously-crafted mythos and cements the series as one of streaming's strongest and strangest science fiction stories."

Critics referred to season two as ominous and much more bizarre than season one, and that the series managed to subvert several tropes regarding the concepts of time travel. The season received a rating of four out of five stars from Jack Seale of The Guardian and Boyd Hilton of Empire, a "B+" grade from Hanh Nguyen of IndieWire, and an "amazing" score of 9 out of 10 from David Griffin of IGN. The latter wrote in his verdict: "Dark Season 2 can hurt your brain at times, trying to piece all the time-traveling narratives together, but in the end, creators Baran bo Odar and Jantje Friese reward your patience with some stellar WTF moments. At eight episodes in length, [it] is a tightly-woven tapestry of compelling stories and memorable performances from the entire ensemble." TV Guide's Kaitlin Thomas was also favorable of the season, saying that "one of the reasons Dark is such a compelling drama isn't just because it presents time travel as something that is possible or because it grounds its story in the emotional narratives of its characters, but because it couches its sci-fi themes in conversations about free will and destiny. [...] [It] excels at building a compelling mystery, and the fact that it never loses the plot itself is a testament to the writing of the series."

The season was included in many critics' year-end lists of 2019. It was ranked as the ninth and tenth best TV show of the year by Maggie Fremont of Screen Crush and John Sellers of Thrillist, respectively. Outside the top ten, TV Guide and Complex named it the 12th and 26th best TV show of the year in their respective list. In addition, CNET and Vogue also listed it on each unranked list.

Season 3 
The third and final season received critical acclaim, particularly for the series' ending, though the increased complexity of the plot drew some criticism. It received a Rotten Tomatoes approval rating of 97% based on 33 reviews, with an average rating of 8.5 out of 10, with the "Certified Fresh" status. The site's critical consensus says, "Darks final chapter is as thrilling as it is bewildering, bringing viewers full circle without sacrificing any of the show's narrative complexities." At Metacritic, the season received an average score of 92, based on four reviews, indicating "universal acclaim."

The season received a rating of five out of five stars from Radio Times's Patrick Cremona and four out of five stars from The Guardian's Jack Seale, an "A-" grade from IndieWire's Steve Greene, and an "amazing" 9 out of 10 from IGN's David Griffin. Cremona deemed it as "science fiction at its most mesmerising, its most confounding and its most exhilarating - and it all makes for a truly irresistible piece of television" and further praised the writing, cinematography, casting, and acting (particularly that of Louis Hoffman, Maja Schöne, and Lisa Vicari). Griffin wrote in his verdict, "Dark's third and final season on Netflix is a memorable journey through time and space, with thrilling character shifts and fascinating paradoxes to unpack." William Goodman of Complex praised the ending, saying, "Odar and Friese masterfully close by showing the symbiotic relationship between endings and beginnings. There's no victory without sacrifice, no light without darkness, and no love without loss. The tension between each of these conflicting ideas is so interwoven, making it hard to discern where one ends and the other begins. And so Dark concludes not with a hard endpoint on a line, but by elegantly and satisfyingly circling back into itself."

The season was listed by many publications as one of the best TV shows of 2020. Radio Times named it the eighth best TV show of the year, with one of the website's writers Patrick Cremona saying, "The final series was another irresistible piece of sci-fi television, equal parts mesmerising and confounding, with a sweeping scope that gave it the sense of a true epic. With its exhilarating finale, Dark has earned its place among the list of the very best original series made for the streamer." Exclaim! ranked it the tenth best TV series of the year. The website's Allie Gregory wrote, "With stunning performances from Louis Hoffman, Oliver Masucci and Karoline Eichhorn (and an incredible score to boot), the apocalyptic time travel sci-fi series deftly concludes its mind-bending journey in its darkest (and Dark-est) instalment yet. [...] [It] manages to neatly tie up all of its loose ends to finally find the one true "origin," so, at last, the town of Winden can free itself from the trappings of time and fate." GameSpot listed it as one of the year's ten best TV shows, with one of its writers Mike Rougeau stating, "what really impressed us about Season 3 is how it wrapped things up, even while continuing the tradition of adding yet another new dimension (so to speak) to the show's tangled timelines. It managed to weave one of the most complex, but somehow still cohesive, sci-fi stories we've ever seen." Outside the top ten, Den of Geek named it the 17th best TV show of 2020. Meanwhile, Thrillist ranked it at number 19 on its "40 Best TV Shows of 2020" list, with one of its writers Emma Stefansky calling the series finale "one of the most shocking and emotional conclusions to a TV show you'll see this year."

Awards and nominations
The series was nominated for the Goldene Kamera TV awards 2018 in three categories: best series; best actress for Karoline Eichhorn as Charlotte Doppler; and best actor for Oliver Masucci as Ulrich Nielsen. None of these nominations resulted in awards, but Louis Hofmann received the "Best Newcomer" award in recognition of his lead role in Dark as well as his performances in several films.

The series was awarded the 2018 Grimme-Preis award in the category "Fiction", which singled out the following cast and crew for awards:
 Jantje Friese (screenplay)
 Baran bo Odar (director)
 Udo Kramer (production design)
 Simone Baer (casting)
 Angela Winkler (actress)
 Louis Hofmann (actor)
 Oliver Masucci (actor)

The actors named are awarded as "representatives for the full cast".

See also
 Bootstrap paradox
Dark matter
 Emerald Tablet
Grandfather paradox
 Higgs boson
 Schrödinger's cat
 Self-fulfilling prophecy

References

External links

 
 Dark – The Official Guide
 
 
 

2017 German television series debuts
2020 German television series endings
2010s LGBT-related drama television series
2010s mystery television series
2010s science fiction television series
2010s teen drama television series
2020s LGBT-related drama television series
2020s mystery television series
2020s science fiction television series
2020s teen drama television series
Apocalyptic television series
Fiction about black holes
Filicide in fiction
Fratricide in fiction
German drama television series
German horror fiction television series
German science fiction television series
German-language Netflix original programming
Grimme-Preis for fiction winners
Incest in television
Lesbian-related television shows
Murder in television
Television series about dysfunctional families
Television series about missing people
Television series about parallel universes
German time travel television series
Television series set in the 1880s
Television series set in the 1920s
Television series set in 1953
Television series set in 1954
Television series set in 1974
Television series set in 1986
Television series set in 1987
Television series set in 2019
Television series set in 2020
Television series set in the 2050s
Television shows set in Germany
Thriller television series
Transgender-related television shows
2010s German television series
2020s German drama television series